Mir Hasani (also Romanized as Mīr Ḩasanī; also known as Mīr ’asanī and Mīr ’oseynī) is a village in Howmeh Rural District, in the Central District of Lamerd County, Fars Province, Iran. At the 2006 census, its population was 227, in 52 families.

References 

Populated places in Lamerd County